NU Hospitals is a chain of dedicated Nephrology & Urology hospitals in India, established in 1999 as a super-specialty quaternary care hospital dedicated for Kidney care. NU Hospitals is an NABH and NABL accredited hospital in this specialty. NU Hospitals is also an accredited seat of teaching and prepares Super-specialists in Urology and Nephrology under the National level DNB programme.

History
NU Hospitals, established in the year 1999 by renowned Urologist Dr. Venkatesh Krishnamoorthy, as a super-specialty quaternary care hospital dedicated for Kidney care. They are Karnataka’s First Nephro-Urology Hospital chain with hospitals in Padmanabhanagar - Bengaluru, Rajajinagar - Bengaluru, Ambur – Tamilnadu Shivamogga, and in the Maldives. Dr. Venkatesh Krishnamoorthy is the founder and chairman of NU Hospitals and recipient of Dr. B. C. Roy Award. Later the hospital is joined by Dr. Prasanna Venkatesh.

Both the hospitals in Bengaluru located at Padmanabhanagar and Rajajinagar are NABH, NABL and NABH – Nursing Excellence accredited. They also have a Central Laboratory which is NABL accredited with similar standards and outcomes. NU Hospitals is also an accredited seat of teaching and prepares Super-specialists in Urology and Nephrology under the National level DNB program. The hospital also runs DNB (Urology) and Pediatric Urology post graduate training  Fellowship Courses at its Padmanabhanagar, Bengaluru, branch.

NU Hospitals – Maldives - National Uro-Renal and Fertility centre in collaboration with NU Hospitals, Bangalore, India. The National Urology Renal and Fertility Centre (NU-RF) was established in Indira Gandhi Memorial Hospital, Republic of Maldives in November 2016.

Branches
NU Hospitals has four facilities in India and one at Maldives, and has branches at Padmanabhanagar and Rajajinagar in Bengaluru, Shivamogga,Ambur  in Tamilnadu and Malé, Maldives.

Awards and recognitions
2017 AHPI Award for Patient friendly Hospital
International Specialist Centre of the Year for Nephrology, Urology & Fertility 2017
National Healthcare Excellence Awards, 2016

References

Hospitals in Bangalore
Hospitals established in 1999
1999 establishments in Karnataka